The 1929 Wake Forest Demon Deacons football team was an American football team that represented Wake Forest University during the 1929 college football season. In its first season under head coach Pat Miller, the team compiled a 6–5–1 record.

Schedule

References

Wake Forest
Wake Forest Demon Deacons football seasons
Wake Forest Demon Deacons football